Fábio Pereira da Cruz (born 30 July 1979), commonly known as Pereira, is a Brazilian retired footballer who played as a central defender.

In January 2002 he left on loan to Turkish club Gaziantepspor.

Honours
Santos
Campeonato Brasileiro Série A: 2002

Grêmio
Campeonato Brasileiro Série B: 2005
Campeonato Gaúcho: 2006, 2007

Coritiba
Campeonato Paranaense: 2010, 2011, 2012, 2013
Campeonato Brasileiro Série B: 2010

References

External links
 
 Guardian Stats Centre
 globoesporte 
 

1979 births
Living people
People from Guarulhos
Brazilian footballers
Brazilian expatriate footballers
Brazilian expatriate sportspeople in Turkey
Expatriate footballers in Turkey
Grêmio Foot-Ball Porto Alegrense players
Santos FC players
Gaziantepspor footballers
CR Vasco da Gama players
Associação Portuguesa de Desportos players
Coritiba Foot Ball Club players
Sport Club do Recife players
Esporte Clube Juventude players
Campeonato Brasileiro Série A players
Campeonato Brasileiro Série B players
Campeonato Brasileiro Série C players
Süper Lig players
Association football defenders
Footballers from São Paulo (state)